The 2020 Missouri Valley men's soccer tournament was the 31st edition of the Missouri Valley Conference Men's Soccer Tournament. The tournament decided the Missouri Valley Conference champion and guaranteed representative into the 2020 NCAA Division I men's soccer tournament.

Background 
The 2020 Missouri Valley Men's Soccer Tournament was originally to be played in November 2020.  However, the Missouri Valley Conference postponed all fall sports with the hope to play them in the spring.

Format 
The MVC Tournament will be contested by the league's top four teams, with the higher seed hosting each game.

Qualified teams 
In the event that not all teams in the conference finish with the same amount of games played, points per game will be used to determine the final standings.

Bracket

Matches

Semifinals

Final

References 

2020
2020 in sports in Iowa
2020 in sports in Missouri
Missouri Valley Conference Men's Soccer Tournament